Vivi Gioi, born Vivienne Trumpy (2 January 1917, Livorno – 12 July 1975, Fregene) was an Italian actress. Her alternative professional last name Diesca was an anagram of De Sica, the famous actor and director with whom she was in love. She is remembered for Il signor Max, starring Vittorio De Sica, an actor with whom she worked again in Red Roses (1940). She won a Nastro d'Argento as Best Supporting Actress for her performance in Giuseppe De Santis' film Tragic Hunt. Her parents were Norwegians.

Selected filmography
 But It's Nothing Serious (1936)
 Frenzy (1939)
 Red Roses (1940)
 Then We'll Get a Divorce (1940)
 The Secret Lover (1941)
 First Love (1941)
 Bengasi (1942)
 Short Circuit (1943)
 Seven Years of Happiness (1943)
 Harlem (1943)
 Night Shift (1944)
 The Whole City Sings (1945)
 Mistress of the Mountains (1950)
 Women Without Names (1950)
 The Bread Peddler (1950)
 Without a Flag (1951)
 Kill the Wicked! (1967)
 The Silkworm (1973)

Notes

External links
 

1917 births
1975 deaths
Italian film actresses
Italian people of Norwegian descent
People from Livorno
Nastro d'Argento winners
20th-century Italian actresses